The 2000–01 Ice Hockey Superleague season was the fifth season of the Sekonda Ice Hockey Superleague (ISL).

Belfast Giants, a new team formed in Northern Ireland, were granted a franchise, although they did not take part in the Benson & Hedges Cup. The Newcastle franchise was sold to Harry Harkimo, co-owner of Jokerit who play in the Finnish SM-liiga, and their name was changed to the Newcastle Jesters (Jokerit being Finnish for Jester).

This season, the league awarded three points for a win, two points for an overtime win and one point for an overtime loss in all competitions except the Benson & Hedges Cup. Any game still tied after overtime was decided by a penalty shootout.

The Sheffield Steelers won a Grand Slam of all available competitions. However, the win was marred by the club being found guilty by the league for breaking the £450,000 wage cap and going into liquidation at the end of the season.

Benson & Hedges Cup
The 2000 Benson & Hedges Cup consisted of the teams from the ISL, minus the Belfast Giants, and the teams from the British National League (BNL). The ISL teams were split into two groups of four teams (groups A and B) and the BNL teams were split into two groups, one of four teams (group C) and one of five teams (group D). Each team played the other teams in the group once at home and away.

The group winners from the BNL groups entered the knock-out stage in a challenge round with the fourth placed teams from the ISL group stage. The winners of the challenge rounds entered the quarter finals with the top three teams from each ISL group.

All games after the group stages were home and away aggregate scores except for the challenge round and the final itself which were one-off games. The final was held at Sheffield Arena.

First round

Group A

Group B

Group C

Group D

Challenge round
Winner Group C (Fife) vs 4th place Group B (Newcastle)
Fife Flyers 1–8 Newcastle Jesters

Winner Group D (Guildford) vs 4th place Group A (Bracknell)
Guildford Flames 1–9 Bracknell Bees

Finals

Quarter-finals
3rd place Group B (Nottingham) vs 2nd place Group A (Manchester)
Nottingham Panthers 3–2 Manchester Storm
Manchester Storm 2–4 Nottingham Panthers (Nottingham win 7–4 on aggregate)

Winner challenge game 2 (Bracknell) vs Winner Group B (Sheffield)
Bracknell Bees 3–4 Sheffield Steelers
Sheffield Steelers 3–2 Bracknell Bees (Sheffield win 7–5 on aggregate)

3rd place Group A (Cardiff) vs 2nd place Group B (London)
Cardiff Devils 2–3 London Knights
London Knights 5–1 Cardiff Devils (London win 8–3 on aggregate)

Winner challenge game 1 (Newcastle) vs Winner Group A (Ayr)
Newcastle Jesters 3–2 Ayr Scottish Eagles
Ayr Scottish Eagles 2–2 Newcastle Jesters (Newcastle win 5–4 on aggregate)

Semi-finals
Winner semi final 2 (Sheffield) vs Winner semi final 1 (Nottingham)
Sheffield Steelers 2–1 Nottingham Panthers
Nottingham Panthers 4–5 Sheffield Steelers (Sheffield win 7–5 on aggregate)

Winner semi final 4 (Newcastle) vs Winner semi final 3 (London)
Newcastle Jesters 3–2 London Knights
London Knights 1–2 Newcastle Jesters (Newcastle win 5–3 on aggregate)

Final
The final took place at Sheffield Arena between Sheffield Steelers and Newcastle Jesters.
Sheffield Steelers 4–0 Newcastle Jesters

Challenge Cup
All nine teams in the league competed in the Challenge Cup. The first round was the first home and away meeting of each team in the league with the points counting towards both the Challenge Cup table and the league table. The top four teams progressed to the semi finals. The semi finals were home and away games with the winner on aggregate progressing to the one off final game.

Sheffield Steelers won the competition for the third time in a row.

First round

Semi-finals
1st place (Belfast) vs 4th place (Sheffield)
Belfast Giants 2–1 Sheffield Steelers
Sheffield Steelers 7–0 Belfast Giants (Sheffield win 8–2 on aggregate)

3rd place (Ayr) vs 2nd place (London)
Ayr Scottish Eagles 5–5 London Knights
London Knights 2–3 Ayr Scottish Eagles (Ayr win 8–7 on aggregate)

FinalWinner semi final 1 vs Winner semi final 2Sheffield Steelers 4–2 Ayr Scottish Eagles

League
Each team played three home games and three away games against each of their opponents. The top eight teams in the league were entered into the playoffs.

Playoffs
The top eight teams in the league took part in the playoffs. Group A consisted of Belfast, London, Nottingham and Sheffield while Group B consisted of Ayr, Bracknell, Cardiff and Manchester. The top two teams from each playoff group qualified for the finals weekend. The third place playoff was dropped for this season.

Group A

Group B

Semi-finalsWinner Group A vs 2nd place Group BLondon Knights 4-1 Ayr Scottish EaglesWinner Group B vs 2nd place Group ABracknell Bees 2–4 Sheffield Steelers

FinalWinner semi final 1 vs Winner semi final 2London Knights 1-2 Sheffield Steelers

Awards
Coach of the Year Trophy – Mike Blaisdell, Sheffield Steelers
Player of the Year Trophy – David Longstaff, Sheffield Steelers
Ice Hockey Annual Trophy – Tony Hand, Ayr Scottish Eagles
British Netminder of the Year – Stevie Lyle, Cardiff Devils

All Star teams

Scoring leaders
The scoring leaders are taken from all league games.

Most points: 60 Greg Bullock (Manchester Storm)
Most goals: 27 Greg Bullock (Manchester Storm)
Most assists: 37 Shayne McCosh (Sheffield Steelers) and Steve Thornton (Cardiff Devils)
Most PIMs: 260''' Claude Jutras (London Knights)

References
Ice Hockey Journalists UK
The Internet Hockey Database
Malcolm Preen's Ice Hockey Results and Tables

Footnotes

Ice Hockey Superleague seasons
1
United